Maslova Pristan is an urban-type settlement in Shebekinsky District of Belgorod Oblast, Russia. Population:

References

Notes

Sources

Urban-type settlements in Belgorod Oblast
Populated places in Shebekinsky District